Luise Heim (born 24 March 1996) is a German badminton player who affiliate with 1. BC Beuel. She competed at the 2014 Summer Youth Olympics in Nanjing, China. Heim was the bronze medalists at the 2015 European Junior Championships in the girls' singles and mixed team event.

Achievements

European Junior Championships 
Girls' singles

BWF International Challenge/Series (1 title, 4 runners-up) 
Women's singles

Women's doubles

  BWF International Challenge tournament
  BWF International Series tournament
  BWF Future Series tournament

References

External links 
 

1996 births
Living people
People from Bad Dürkheim
German female badminton players
Badminton players at the 2014 Summer Youth Olympics
Sportspeople from Rhineland-Palatinate